Andrzej Piotr Kostrzewa (born 31 July 1958) is a Polish fencer. He competed at the 1980 and 1988 Summer Olympics.

References

1958 births
Living people
People from Nisko
Polish male fencers
Olympic fencers of Poland
Fencers at the 1980 Summer Olympics
Fencers at the 1988 Summer Olympics
Sportspeople from Podkarpackie Voivodeship